The Charlotte District is a line operated by Norfolk Southern Railway. The line is part of the Norfolk Southern Coastal Division; the district runs between Greenville, South Carolina, and Linwood, North Carolina.

Trains 
Intermodal, manifest, coal trains, and Amtrak run on the Charlotte District. 20-30 trains a day run through Charlotte, North Carolina, while between C.P. Charlotte Junction (a connector to the R-Line) and Gaffney, South Carolina, it is usually 10-18 trains a day. Most regional trains do not need track authorities from the Charlotte dispatcher; however, they are given to track supervisors, signal maintainers, locals, or trains that need to do the switching.

See also
List of Norfolk Southern Railway lines

References

Norfolk Southern Railway lines
Rail infrastructure in North Carolina
Rail infrastructure in South Carolina